Cruse Bereavement Support and its counterpart Cruse Bereavement Care Scotland are the United Kingdom's largest bereavement charity, which provide free care and bereavement counselling to people suffering from grief.

Purpose
Cruse Bereavement Support is the UK's largest charity for bereaved people in England, Wales and Northern Ireland, with a sister organisation in Scotland. Cruse offers face-to-face, group, telephone, email and website support to people after someone close to them has died and works to enhance society's care of bereaved people.

Cruse has a freephone national helpline (0808 808 1677) and local services throughout England, Wales and Northern Ireland. Cruse also has a specialist website for  young people, hopeagain.org.uk. Cruse services are provided by trained volunteers and are confidential and free. Cruse also provides training and consultancy for organisations and for those who may come into contact with bereaved people in the course of their work

History
Founded in 1959 by Margaret Torrie In 1973 the charity moved to its own premises in Richmond upon Thames with the support of a grant from the government. The organisation grew out of Torrie's work for the Citizen's advice bureau and its founding aim was to support widows with advice and assistance. The first branch of Cruse Scotland opened in the late 1960s, and by the mid 1990s there were 28 branches.

The name is derived from the Old Testament story of the raising of the son of the widow of Zarephath in which the widow's cruse is caused by the prophet to supply an everlasting supply of oil.

Operations
Services are provided mainly through locally co-ordinated groups, staffed by 4,500 trained volunteers aided by 186 staff in 2022. The charity turns over about £8m per year. In 2016/7, Cruse said they:
Gave one-to-one help to over 30,000 people
Helped over 3000 in groups
Supported over 5,000 children and young people
Responded to nearly 70,000 requests

Training
Cruse is a member of the British Association for Counselling and Psychotherapy and it provides training to its 5,000 bereavement support volunteers, following ethics set out by BACP. Once certified, an additional 15hrs of additional training is provided per year and external training is accredited by the National Counselling society.

Organisation
Royal Patrons: (previously) Queen Elizabeth II
Patrons: Virginia Bottomley, Baroness Bottomley of Nettlestone; Vincent Nichols, Archbishop of Westminster; Graham James, Lord Bishop of Norwich;   Gisela Stuart MP;  Ann Cryer; Baroness Kramer of Richmond Park;  Dame Jo Williams;  Mark Francois, MP; Lady Hannam 
Life President: Colin Murray Parkes, OBE

Management
Chief Executive: Steven Wibberley 
Chief Operating Officer: Andy Langford
Director, Cruse Wales: Janette Bourne
Director, Cruse Northern Ireland: Paul Finnegan

References

External links
Cruse Bereavement Support
Cruse Scotland website
 Cruse’s support website for young people, HopeAgain

Organizations established in 1957
1957 establishments in the United Kingdom
Mental health organisations in the United Kingdom
Counseling organizations
Organisations based in the United Kingdom with royal patronage
Charities based in London
Organisations based in the London Borough of Richmond upon Thames